Gianclaudio Giuseppe "Clay" Regazzoni (5 September 1939 – 15 December 2006) was a Swiss racing driver. He competed in Formula One races from 1970 to 1980, winning five Grands Prix. His first win was the Italian Grand Prix at Monza in his debut season, driving for Ferrari. He remained with the Italian team until .

He was replaced by Carlos Reutemann at Williams for 1980 and moved back to Ensign. Following an accident at the 1980 United States Grand Prix West he was left paralyzed from the waist down, ending his career in Formula One. Regazzoni did not stop racing, however; he competed in the Paris-Dakar rally and Sebring 12 hours using a hand controlled car during the late 1980s and early 1990s. In 1996, Regazzoni became a commentator for Italian TV.

He was known as a hard charging racer; Jody Scheckter stated that if "he'd been a cowboy he'd have been the one in the black hat." Regazzoni died in a car accident in Italy on 15 December 2006.

Personal and early life
Gianclaudio Regazzoni was born in Mendrisio, Switzerland on 5 September 1939, a few days after the start of the Second World War. Regazzoni grew up in Porza, in the Canton of Ticino, part of the Italian speaking region of Switzerland. He was married to Maria Pia, with whom he had two children: Alessia and Gian Maria.

Racing career

Pre-Formula One

Early racing and Formula Three
Regazzoni first started competing in car races in 1963, at the comparatively late age of 24. Many of his early motorsport experiences were across the border in Italy, Switzerland having banned motor racing following the horrific accident at the 1955 24 Hours of Le Mans race. His first outings were in his own Austin-Healey Sprite, with which he took two podium finishes from only his first three races. This instant success encouraged Regazzoni to move up to a Mini Cooper for the 1964 club racing season.

1965 saw Clay Regazzoni behind the wheel of an open-wheeled car for the first time, as he entered the European Formula Three championship with a Brabham. This first season brought moderate success, and improving form during 1966 (this time driving a De Tomaso) brought him to the attention of ambitious Italian constructor Tecno. Tecno offered Regazzoni the use of one of their F3 chassis for 1967, where his reliable, fast performances earned him the offer of a works Tecno drive in Formula Two for the following year. Despite this, Regazzoni continued to drive in Formula Three events during 1968 and, not for the last time, was lucky to survive a major accident. Exiting the chicane during the Monaco Grand Prix Formula 3 support race, Regazzoni lost control of his car and collided heavily with the crash barrier. The diminutive size of the Formula 3 machine allowed it to pass under the rail, the sharp metal edge of the Armco slicing across the top of the open cockpit. Regazzoni managed to duck down low enough in the driving seat for the rail to pass above him, missing his head by a tiny margin. The car eventually came to a halt when the roll hoop, behind Regazzoni's head and significantly lower than the top of his helmet, wedged itself underneath the barrier.

Formula Two
In Formula Two, Regazzoni had found the ideal partner in Tecno. His hard-charging style perfectly matched the forward thinking Tecno ambitions, and Regazzoni quickly developed a reputation as a tough competitor. Regazzoni was implicated in the death of young British driver Chris Lambert at the 1968 Formula Two Dutch Grand Prix. Some observers accused Regazzoni, who was running well up the field, of deliberately running Lambert's Brabham off the track while lapping him. Lambert lost control and crashed into a bridge. Regazzoni was fully exonerated at the subsequent inquest, although rumours persisted for many years afterward. Lambert's father pursued a private action against Regazzoni, which dragged on for five years before finally being abandoned. Regazzoni remained with Tecno throughout his three years in Formula Two (although he drove most of the 1969 season for the Ferrari Formula Two team.) and in 1970 they took the European Formula Two Championship together.

Sports car racing

As well as single seater racing, Regazzoni participated in sports car racing, including the 1970 24 Hours of Le Mans where he and Arturo Merzario raced a Ferrari 512S. However, the pair retired after completing only 38 laps. This would prove to be Regazzoni's only appearance at the 24 Hours of Le Mans, although he did test for the 1972 event.

For the following two years Regazzoni was a permanent fixture in Ferrari's sports car racing squad. With the new 312B-based 312P cars underneath him, Regazzoni regularly ran at or near the front of the field. Regularly partnered with Jacky Ickx, the pairing took second place in the BOAC 1000 km at Brands Hatch in 1971, and won the first heat during the Imola 500 km. Regazzoni also won the Kyalami 9 Hours race, this time in partnership with Brian Redman. Further successes followed in 1972, with second places at the 1000 km Buenos Aires, partnered again by Redman, and prestigious Spa 1000 km race. The high point of the season came when the Regazzoni/Ickx partnership won the Monza 1000 km race.

With his departure from Ferrari during 1973, Regazzoni's sports car results dried up. His uncompetitive Alfa Romeo 33 TT was thoroughly outclassed by the Ferrari and Matra opposition. At the end of 1973 Ferrari withdrew from sports car racing, and Regazzoni's move to rejoin the Ferrari Formula One team in 1974 effectively ended his sports car career, as he could not then race for other manufacturers.

Formula One

1970–72: Ferrari

During the early races of the 1970 Formula One season Ferrari only entered one car, for Belgian Jacky Ickx, but at the fourth round in Belgium, the team decided to run a second car to try out some younger drivers. Italian Ignazio Giunti was given the second seat in Belgium, where he finished fourth, while Regazzoni took his place at the following round in the Netherlands, also finishing fourth. Giunti was back in the seat for the following Grand Prix in France, but finished fourteenth, three laps behind the winner and eventual 1970 World Champion Jochen Rindt.

Regazzoni was back in the Ferrari for the British Grand Prix, where he finished fourth again, but this time Regazzoni kept the race seat. Four podium finishes followed for Regazzoni during the final six rounds of the 1970 season, including a win at Monza, Ferrari's home race. However, the race was overshadowed by the death of Championship leader Rindt, during qualifying for the race. A first pole position, at the final round in Mexico, capped a hugely successful first season in the top formula. Regazzoni finished third in the Drivers' Championship with 33 points, 12  points behind posthumous World Champion Rindt.

Following the death of Giunti at a sports car event during the winter of 1971, Ferrari opted for Ickx and Regazzoni for the 1971 Formula One season. Prior to the start of the European legs of the Formula One World Championship, Regazzoni won the prestigious Race of Champions at Brands Hatch, beating Jackie Stewart into second place. Despite this early promise, the Ferrari 312B and B2 proved to be inferior to the Stewart/Tyrrell 003 combination. Regazzoni only managed three podium finishes during the season, as well a pole position at the British Grand Prix. The Swiss finished seventh in the Drivers' Championship that year, 49 points behind World Champion Jackie Stewart.

Further disappointment for Regazzoni followed in 1972, with only a single podium finish, in Germany, although he did score two points more than the previous season. Regazzoni again finished seventh in the Drivers' Championship, 46 points behind World Champion Emerson Fittipaldi.

1973: BRM
Regazzoni opted to leave Ferrari in 1973, in favour of Marlboro-sponsored BRM for what was reported as "an astronomical fee". Here he joined young driver Niki Lauda, and the two became firm friends. After a huge crash during the South African Grand Prix, he was pulled from the blazing wreckage by Mike Hailwood, who was later awarded the George Medal for his heroism in saving Regazzoni's life. It proved to be an unsuccessful year for Regazzoni, despite a pole position in the 1973 Argentine Grand Prix season opener. He was reported to have become disillusioned with "uncompetitive machinery" as he scored just two points during the entire season, his worst points haul from a full season in Formula One. He achieved a lowly 17th place in the championship.

1974–76: Back to Ferrari

Ferrari had a big personnel shake-up at the start of 1974, after Luca Cordero di Montezemolo was hired to run the Italian team. Both Regazzoni and, on Regazzoni's recommendation, Lauda were picked up by Ferrari. Regazzoni was soon back on the podium. Seven podium finishes, including a win in Germany, his first since his debut season win at Monza fours years earlier, as well as a pole position at Nivelles, allowed Regazzoni to outscore the up-and-coming Lauda. Entering the last race of the season, in the USA Regazzoni was well in contention for the title, and only needed to finish ahead of rival, Emerson Fittipaldi, to take the crown. Regazzoni suffered handling problems during the race due to a defective shock absorber and could finish only 11th after two pit stops. He finished second in the Drivers' Championship, his career best, just three points behind Fittipaldi.

Ferrari retained Lauda and Regazzoni's services for 1975 and the pair took six victories between them: five for Lauda, and one for Regazzoni at the 1975 Italian Grand Prix. Regazzoni also won his home Grand Prix, the non-championship Swiss Grand Prix, the only Swiss driver to have done so. Ferrari secured the Constructors' Championship, and Lauda won the first of his three World titles. Regazzoni finished fifth in the Drivers' Championship with 25 points.

1976 would prove to be the start of Regazzoni's downward slide in Formula One. Despite winning from pole position at Long Beach, and a further three podium finishes, Ferrari replaced the Swiss with Argentine Carlos Reutemann. The Argentine never got on with Lauda as well as Regazzoni did. When he left Ferrari, Regazzoni was the longest serving Ferrari driver.

1977: Ensign
Following his release from Ferrari, Regazzoni opted for a move to the Ensign team. His move to such a small team surprised some, but Regazzoni opted for the small outfit in preference to an offer from Bernie Ecclestone to drive for Brabham, as he preferred "to race with nice people". His season with Ensign, despite managing a points finish on his debut in Argentina, was not successful. Regazzoni finished in the points only a further two times, and ended the season with a total of five points. In May Regazzoni participated in the Indianapolis 500 driving a McLaren-Offenhauser for Theodore Racing. He crashed heavily in practice, but managed to qualify. He finished in 30th place after a fuel cell gave out during his first pit stop.

1978: Shadow
Regazzoni moved to Shadow in 1978, as a replacement for Alan Jones who had left to join Williams. Only two points scoring finishes followed for Regazzoni and he finished the season 16th in the Drivers' Championship, 60 points behind World Champion Mario Andretti.

1979: Williams

Frank Williams gave Regazzoni his final drive in a competitive car alongside Alan Jones. The Williams FW07 proved to be very competitive, especially in the final part of the season, with FW07s winning all but two of the final seven races of the 1979 calendar. The first win was for Regazzoni, at Silverstone, the first of over 100 victories for the Williams Grand Prix team. In deference to the team's Saudi sponsors, he celebrated on the podium with Lilt. However, despite his achievement, once again he was replaced by Carlos Reutemann at the end of the season. At the Italian Grand Prix, motor sport journalist Nigel Roebuck asked Regazzoni why he continued to drive at the age of 40, with no prospect of a competitive seat. Regazzoni replied, "I love [Formula One], and most of all I love to drive racing cars. So why should I stop when I feel this way?". At the end of the year he was invited to compete in the 1980 International Race of Champions, the last active Formula One driver, alongside Mario Andretti, to do so.

1980: Back with Ensign

Lacking an offer for a competitive drive in 1980, Regazzoni re-joined Ensign. His season came to an abrupt end only four races into the year. He crashed during the 1980 United States Grand Prix West, held at Long Beach, when the brake pedal of his Ensign failed at the end of a long, high-speed straight travelling at approximately 280 km/h. Ricardo Zunino's retired Brabham was parked in the escape road. Regazzoni later recalled, "I hit Zunino's car, then bounced into the barrier. For about 10 minutes I lost consciousness. Then I remember terrible pain in my hips...". The crash left Regazzoni paralyzed from the waist down, ending his competitive career. On recovery, Regazzoni sued the race organisers, claiming their safety procedures were sub-standard.  The race organisers won the case.

After Formula One
After this accident, Regazzoni became known for his activities in helping disabled people get equal opportunities in life and society.  Despite his disability, Regazzoni was determined to live as full a life as possible.

Regazzoni won back his racing licence and became one of the first disabled drivers to participate in high-level motor sports.  Although his injuries made a Formula One return impossible, Regazzoni raced with some success in rally raids (e.g. the Dakar Rally) and sportscars (e.g. the 12 Hours of Sebring). These achievements paved the way for the wider acceptance of disabled persons in motoring and motorsports. Regazzoni's last competitive race was in 1990, although he was occasionally offered test drives in racing cars during the 1990s. In 1994, he returned to the Long Beach Grand Prix (at that point an IndyCar race) to compete as a Pro in the Toyota Pro/Celebrity Race.

An account of his life can be found in his autobiography È questione di cuore ("It's a Matter of Heart") published in the mid-1980s. His post-Formula One career occasionally saw him as a commentator for Swiss and Italian television.

He once commented to Niki Lauda, his ten years younger teammate: "if you drive as tensed up as you behave yourself towards women, you will never become great".

Death
On 15 December 2006, Regazzoni was killed when the Chrysler Voyager he was driving hit the rear of a lorry on the Italian A1 motorway, near Parma. Crash investigators estimate that he was travelling at approximately 100 km/h at the time and, despite early speculation, an autopsy specifically excluded a heart attack from being responsible for Regazzoni's loss of control. His funeral was held on 23 December, in Lugano, and was attended by Jackie Stewart, Emerson Fittipaldi and Niki Lauda, among many luminaries from the Formula One world.

Portrayal in media
In the 2013 Ron Howard film Rush, which depicts the rivalry between James Hunt and Niki Lauda in the 1976 Formula One season, he is portrayed by Pierfrancesco Favino.

Racing record

Career summary

 Graded drivers not eligible for  European Formula Two Championship points

Complete European Formula Two Championship results
(key) (Races in bold indicate pole position; races in italics indicate fastest lap)

 Graded drivers not eligible for  European Formula Two Championship points

Complete 24 Hours of Le Mans results

Complete Formula One World Championship results
(key) (Races in bold indicate pole position; races in italics indicate fastest lap)

Non-Championship Formula One results
(key) (Races in bold indicate pole position; results in italics indicate fastest lap)

Indianapolis 500 results

References

References

 Formula One world championship results are taken from the Official Formula One website archive of results at www.formula1.com.
 Formula One non-championship results are taken from the Formula One archives at www.silhouet.com
 Formula Two championship results are taken from the Le Mans and Formula Two Register at www.formula2.net.
 World Sportscar Championship results are taken from wspr-racing.com

External links 

1974 United States Grand Prix www.gpracing.net192.com Retrieved 1 March 2007

Chequered Flag Motorsport's Tribute to Clay
Aiutiamo la paraplegia – Club Clay Regazzoni Onlus. The only Club authorized by Clay Regazzoni himself

 

1939 births
2006 deaths
Swiss people of Italian descent
Swiss racing drivers
Swiss Formula One drivers
Ferrari Formula One drivers
BRM Formula One drivers
Ensign Formula One drivers
Shadow Formula One drivers
Williams Formula One drivers
Formula One race winners
European Formula Two Championship drivers
Indianapolis 500 drivers
International Race of Champions drivers
Road incident deaths in Italy
24 Hours of Le Mans drivers
Dakar Rally drivers
People from Mendrisio
World Sportscar Championship drivers
Sportsmen with disabilities
Sportspeople from Ticino
BMW M drivers